Son of Django (also known as Vengeance Is a Colt 45 and Return of Django) is a 1967 Italian Spaghetti Western film written and directed by Osvaldo Civirani.

Plot
When he was a child, Jeff Tracey's father, Django, was murdered by an unknown assailant. A now adult Tracey has become a gunslinger searching for the killer. After his horse is stolen, Tracey arrives in the territory of Topeka, where rival ranchers Thompson and Clay Ferguson compete for control of the area. Tracey is imprisoned after killing three of Clay's men. Tracey escapes jail with the aid of his cellmate, a Frenchman known as Four Aces, and Logan, both of whom work for Thompson. They offer Tracey a job, but he distrusts Thompson, believing that he played a role in Django's murder.

Tracey aids Four Aces and Logan in defending pro-Thompson rancher Joe Grayson when he is assaulted by Clay henchmen. Tracey meets the preacher Gus Fleming, who explains he saved Tracey after his father was killed. The territorial conflict proceeds to escalate, with Clay sending men to burn down several Thompson ranches, including one belonging to Grayson. Clay later kills Grayson when he confronts the boss in his saloon.

Grayson's wife, Jane, attempts to avenge her husband, but Clay accidentally kills her. Tracey learns Clay was responsible for killing his father, and ignores Fleming's attempts to dissuade him from seeking vengeance. Tracey attempts to confront Clay only to be ambushed and tortured. Fleming intervenes and saves Tracey, only for Tracey to knock him out so he can continue his quest for vengeance undisturbed.

Clay heavily fortifies his saloon, expecting Tracey to arrive soon. Tracey breaks into the saloon and a gunfight erupts. Fleming returns to town and intercepts a large Clay posse. When informed of the fighting, Thompson sends word to his men and then joins Fleming. With his henchmen overpowered, Clay absconds with the money, killing Thompson's traitorous lieutenant Mack in the process.

Tracey pursues Clay, finding him already captured and tied up by Fleming, Thompson, and his men. Tracey shoots Clay's ropes, then shares one last look with Fleming before departing.

Cast 
 Guy Madison as Father Gus Fleming
 Gabriele Tinti as Jeff Tracey
 Ingrid Schöller as Jane Grayson
 Daniele Vargas as Clay Ferguson
 Pedro Sanchez as Thompson
 Ivan Scratt as Four Aces
 Andrea Scotti as coward sheriff
 Renato Mambor as Clint Sullivan
 Bob Messenger as Logan
 Christl Penz as Saloon singer
 Luis Chavarro as Eyepatch
 Franco Gulà as Hotel Clerk
 Lucio De Santis as Hurricane, Henchman
 Luciano Rossi as Mack
 John Bartha as Sheriff
 Giuseppe Castellano as Bill
 Giorgio Dionisio as Joe Grayson
 Piero Morgia as Ferguson's Right Hand
 Remo Capitani as Thompson Henchman
 Carol Danell as Carol, Saloon Singer
 Alberigo Donadeo as Townsman
 Rocco Lerro as Ferguson Henchman
 Osiride Pevarello as Bum, Eyepatch Henchman
 Attilio Severini as Ferguson Henchman
 Franco Ukmar as Ferguson Henchman
 The Wilder Brothers as Musicians

References

External links

1967 films
Spaghetti Western films
1960s Western (genre) comedy films
Films directed by Osvaldo Civirani
Films scored by Piero Umiliani
Films set in Kansas
1967 comedy films
1960s Italian-language films
1960s Italian films